Peng! is the debut studio album by English-French rock band Stereolab. It was released on 26 May 1992 by Too Pure in the United Kingdom. The album was issued in the United States on 13 June 1995 by Too Pure and American Recordings. A remastered edition of the album was released on 9 November 2018 by Too Pure and Beggars Arkive.

The album's title (a German onomatopoeia for a loud pop or bang) and cover art are derived from a comic strip named "Der tödliche Finger" that appeared in a 1970 issue of Hotcha, a Swiss underground newspaper. Different panels of the same strip were adapted into cover art for other early Stereolab releases, and remain popular icons for the band.

Track listing

Personnel
Credits are adapted from the album's liner notes.

Stereolab
 Tim Gane – guitar, Farfisa organ, Moog synthesizer
 Lætitia Sadier – vocals, Moog synthesizer
 Joe Dilworth – drums
 Martin Kean – bass

Production
 Roger Askew – engineering
 Robbs – production, engineering, mixing
 Stereolab – production, mixing

Charts

References

External links
 Peng! at official Stereolab website
 
 

1992 debut albums
Stereolab albums
Too Pure albums
American Recordings (record label) albums